Norwich is a village in Muskingum County, Ohio, United States. The population was 102 at the 2010 census.

History
Norwich was laid out in 1827, and named after Norwich, in England, the native home of a first settler. A post office has been in operation at Norwich since 1828. By 1833, Norwich had four stores, two churches, and two taverns. The village was incorporated in 1833.

Geography
Norwich is located at  (39.985203, -81.791680).

Demographics

2010 census
As of the census of 2010, there were 102 people, 49 households, and 34 families living in the village. The racial makeup of the village was 100.0% White.

There were 49 households, of which 20.4% had children under the age of 18 living with them, 55.1% were married couples living together, 6.1% had a female householder with no husband present, 8.2% had a male householder with no wife present, and 30.6% were non-families. 26.5% of all households were made up of individuals, and 16.3% had someone living alone who was 65 years of age or older. The average household size was 2.08 and the average family size was 2.41.

The median age in the village was 49 years. 11.8% of residents were under the age of 18; 9.7% were between the ages of 18 and 24; 18.7% were from 25 to 44; 43.1% were from 45 to 64; and 16.7% were 65 years of age or older. The gender makeup of the village was 51.0% male and 49.0% female.

2000 census
As of the census of 2000, there were 113 people, 40 households, and 32 families living in the village. The population density was 1,175.0 people per square mile (436.3/km). There were 46 housing units at an average density of 478.3 per square mile (177.6/km). The racial makeup of the village was 99.12% White and 0.88% Native American.

There were 40 households, out of which 40.0% had children under the age of 18 living with them, 67.5% were married couples living together, 2.5% had a female householder with no husband present, and 20.0% were non-families. 17.5% of all households were made up of individuals, and 2.5% had someone living alone who was 65 years of age or older. The average household size was 2.83 and the average family size was 3.13.

In the village, the population was spread out, with 28.3% under the age of 18, 8.0% from 18 to 24, 35.4% from 25 to 44, 21.2% from 45 to 64, and 7.1% who were 65 years of age or older. The median age was 34 years. For every 100 females there were 79.4 males. For every 100 females age 18 and over, there were 102.5 males.

The median income for a household in the village was $37,250, and the median income for a family was $43,750. Males had a median income of $29,583 versus $25,000 for females. The per capita income for the village was $14,673. There were 21.4% of families and 36.2% of the population living below the poverty line, including 61.5% of under eighteens and none of those over 64.

Notable person

 Chalmers Wylie - American politician who served thirteen terms as a member of the United States House of Representatives

References

Villages in Muskingum County, Ohio
Villages in Ohio
1827 establishments in Ohio
Populated places established in 1827